List of G8 summit resorts includes past and prospective venues for the annual meetings of G8 heads of state, the President of the European Union and other invited guests.

The choice of a site for these summit meetings is left entirely to the host nation.  The location choices of host nations have been informed in some cases by perceived pre- and post-summit economic benefits.

The serial accounts of these summits have tended to focus on international macro-consequences; but the host-country's decision-making has also seemed to focus on micro-consequences which have been otherwise overshadowed or overlooked.

Summit venues

References

G7 summits